This is a list of cover versions by notable music artists of songs written by American singer-songwriter Phil Ochs, who wrote or recorded at least 238 songs during his brief career. In 1965, Joan Baez had a No. 8 hit in the UK with her cover of "There but for Fortune", a song written by Ochs. It was also nominated for a Grammy Award for "Best Folk Recording". In the US it peaked at No. 50 on the Billboard charts—a good showing, but not a hit.

Except where indicated, all songs were written by Ochs.

Key

List

See also
List of songs recorded by Phil Ochs

References

Notes

Footnotes

Works cited

Further reading

External links
 
 Phil Ochs at SecondHandSongs
 Phil Ochs Cover List, compiled by David Cohen
 Sonny Ochs
 Phil Ochs Song Nights from the Kennedy Center (Video)

Ochs, Phil
Cover Versions
 
Ochs